Weinheim is a town with about 43,000 inhabitants in northwest Baden-Württemberg, Germany. Weinheim is known as the "Zwei-Burgen-Stadt", the "town of two castles", after two fortresses overlooking the town from the edge of the Odenwald in the east.

Geography 

Weinheim is situated on the Bergstraße theme route on the western rim of the Odenwald. The old town lies in the valley, with the new part of town further to the west. The Market Square is filled with numerous cafes, as well as the old Rathaus (guildhall). Further to the south is the Schlossgarten (Palace Garden) and the Exotenwald (Exotic Forest), which contains species of trees imported from around the world, but mostly from North America and Japan.

History 
Weinheim celebrated its 1250th anniversary in 2005.

The earliest record of Weinheim dates back to 755 CE, when the name "Winenheim" was recorded in the Lorsch codex, the record book of Lorsch Abbey.

In 1000, Emperor Otto III bestowed on Weinheim the right to hold markets, and in 1065 the right to mint and issue coins. A new town developed next to the old town from 1250. In 1308, the old town was transferred to the Electorate of the Palatinate. From 1368 the whole town belonged to the Electorate of the Palatinate, and since the end of the 14th century to the Heidelberg Oberamt district. With the transfer to Baden in 1803, Weinheim became the seat of its own Amt, which was unified with Landkreis Mannheim in 1936. From 1938 onwards Weinheim belonged to Landkreis Mannheim until January 1, 1973, when the Rhein-Neckar-Kreis was formed.

A Jewish community in Weinheim is first recorded in 1228. There were persecutions in Weinheim in 1298 (Rintfleisch massacres) and 1348–49 (Black Death persecutions). The Jews were expelled from Weinheim in 1391. The Weinheim Jewish community began to grow again in the Thirty Years' War. There was a synagogue, a beth midrash, and a mikveh, and, in the 19th century, a school for boys and a teacher-training college. The synagogue was destroyed in the Kristallnacht (9–10 November 1938) and the last few Jews sent to Gurs on 22 October 1940.

Local attractions 

 Windeck Castle, originally built around 1100 to protect the Lorsch monastery; it was badly damaged in the Thirty Years' War and again by Louis XIV of France in the Nine Years' War.
 Wachenburg Castle, built between 1907 and 1928 by German Student Corps fraternities; the annual convention of the Weinheimer Senioren-Convent is held at the Wachenburg.
 The Market Square
 The Schloss, home of the town council
 Gerberbach Quarter, old haunt of the leather makers
 Schlosspark
 Waidsee Lido, swimming beach on the Waidsee artificial lake
 Miramar (Weinheim) thermal spa and sauna complex, next to the Waidsee lake
 Exotenwald Weinheim, a forest arboretum
 Schau- und Sichtungsgarten Hermannshof, a botanical garden

Museum 
Weinheim's town museum occupies what used to be the local headquarters of the Teutonic Order and holds exhibits about Weinheim and its surroundings: archaeology from the prehistoric through to the Merovingian dynasty, the highlight of which is the Nächstenbach bronze hoard of 76 objects from the late Bronze Age; displays documenting the Medieval and modern social history of the town and works from contemporary artists.

Events 

February: High-jump Gala, with world class high-jumpers
March: the Sommertagszug, a festival celebrating the coming of summer.
May/June (near Ascension Day): day of the Weinheimer Senioren-Convents
June–August: Weinheim's summer of culture
June: Scheuerfest (barn party) in Ritschweier
July: the Weinheim road race
May–September: Kerwes in Rippenweier, Sulzbach, Lützelsachsen, Oberflockenbach und Hohensachsen
August (second weekend thereof): Weinheim's Kerwe (Friday to Monday)
September (first Friday-Sunday): Weinheimer UKW-Tagung, a three-day international amateur radio meeting held annually since 1956
October: Bergsträßer Winzerfest (lit. "mountain-road vintner festival") in Lützelsachsen

Local businesses 
Beltz Verlag
Freudenberg Group
 Schlegel und Partner GmbH
Kukident GmbH, Reckitt Benckiser AG
Naturin
OAGIS
T-Systems ITS GmbH
Wiley-VCH publishers
3 Glocken
Weinheimer Nachrichten
Druckhaus Diesbach
SAP SE
Domaniecki Carpetence
DLCON

Transport

Trains
Weinheim has two main train stations on the Main-Neckar Railway, these being Weinheim (Bergstraße) station (served by Regional and long-distance IC trains) and Lützelsachsen (served by Regional trains). These provide connections to Frankfurt, Hamburg and other destinations within Germany. 
 Deutsche Bahn
 Rhein-Neckar Verkehr VRN | Startseite

Weinheim is also served by the OEG tramway, which is used daily by people who use this to commute to the cities of Mannheim and Heidelberg.

Air

The closest airports to Weinheim are:

Frankfurt Airport 
Baden Airpark

Twin towns – sister cities

Weinheim is twinned with:

 Anet, France
 Cavaillon, France
 Eisleben, Germany
 Imola, Italy
 Ramat Gan, Israel
 Varces-Allières-et-Risset, France

Population
These are the population figures for particular years. There are drawn from guesses, 'Volkszählungsergebnisse (semi-official figures, demarcated by a ¹) and official statistics based on place of residence (Hauptwohnsitz).

¹ These are taken from a Volkszählungsergebnis.

Notable people
Friedrich Rauch (1786–1829), colonel who fought and died in Argentina
Heinrich Hübsch (1795–1863), head of public works
Karl Seidenadel (1829–1894), translator of Greek works
Philipp Bickel (1829–1914), baptist theologian and publisher
Friedrich August Bender (1847–1926), chemist and entrepreneur
Wilhelm Platz (1866–1929), factory owner and author
Richard Freudenberg (1892–1975), politician (FDP)
Erwin Linder (1903–1968), actor and voice actor
Heidi Mohr (born 1967), footballer
Ralf Sonn (born 1967), high jumper
Markus Kuhn (born 1986), NFL player

Worked in the town
Ingrid Noll (born 1935), writer (e.g. "Die Apothekerin"), lived in Weinheim
Karl Friedrich Bender (1806–1869), theologian, teacher, principal of the Erziehungsanstalt für Knaben (boys' school)

Honorary citizens
The town of Weinheim has made the following people honorary citizens (Ehrenbürger):
1894: Carl Johann Freudenberg, Geheimer Kommerzienrat (royal economist)
1904: Erhard Bissinger, Consul general
1913: Aute Bode, chief engineer and the architect behind the Wachenburg
1918: Hermann Ernst Freudenberg, Geheimer Kommerzienrat (royal economist)
1922: Georg Friedrich Vogler, vice-mayor
1923: Adam Karrillon, doctor and author
1928: Emil Hartmann, construction engineer
1928: Prof. Arthur Wienkoop, Architect
1933: Paul von Hindenburg, German President
1940: Georg Peter Nickel, agriculturist
1949: Richard Freudenberg, factory owner
1953: Hans Freudenberg, factory owner
1954: Sepp Herberger, sports trainer, trainer of the German World Cup winning side of 1954
1962: Wilhelm Brück, Lord Mayor
1986: Theo Gießelmann, Lord Mayor
2004: Dieter Freudenberg, factory owner
2004: Wolfgang Daffinger, mayor, representative in the Landtag
2005: Uwe Kleefoot, Lord Mayor

References

External links

 
Towns in Baden-Württemberg
Rhein-Neckar-Kreis
Baden